Tallinn Bay is a bay in Estonia on the southern coast of the Gulf of Finland. The Estonian capital city Tallinn is located on the southern coast of the bay.

Tallinn Bay itself is divided into several parts: Tallinn Roadstead, Kopli Bay, Kakumäe Bay and Paljassaare Bay. The islands Naissaar and Aegna border the bay in the north, the Viimsi Peninsula to the east.

The shore waters are shallow but deep rapidly. Tallinn Bay has a steep slope, which allows for good water exchange with the waters of the Gulf of Finland. Tallinn Bay is one of the deepest bays in Estonia, max depth is about 100 m.

The Old Town is situated close to the sheltered Tallinn bay, which is a natural harbour and the main passenger port. The Paljassaare Harbour and the Bekker Harbor by the Kopli Bay serve for cargo traffic. There are four public beaches on the coastline: Pirita, Stroomi, Kakumäe and Pikakari.

Gallery

See also
Bungsberg, ship
Copterline Flight 103
Estonian Maritime Museum
Charles Leroux

References

External links

Landforms of Tallinn
Bays of Estonia
Bays of the Baltic Sea